Olimpia CSU Braşov is a professional women's basketball team from Brașov, Romania. The club plays in the  Liga Națională and its home arena is Dumitru Popescu Colibași Sports Hall.

Honours
 Cupa României
Runners-up (2): 2015–16, 2016–17
 Liga I
Winners (1): 2009–10

Notable players

References

External links
 Eurobasket 
 Totalbaschet 

Sport in Brașov
Basketball teams in Romania
Women's basketball teams in Romania
Basketball teams established in 2008
2008 establishments in Romania